Carlton Williamson (born June 12, 1958) is a former college and NFL football player who was selected by the San Francisco 49ers in the 3rd round of the 1981 NFL Draft. A 6'0", 200 lbs. safety from the University of Pittsburgh, Williamson was a 2-time Pro Bowl selection in 1984 and 1985 and a 3-time Super Bowl winner. He played in eight  NFL seasons and his entire career with the 49ers from 1981 to 1988.  In his career, he recorded 17 interceptions for 294 yards and 1 touchdown.

References

1958 births
Living people
American football safeties
Pittsburgh Panthers football players
San Francisco 49ers players
National Conference Pro Bowl players
Players of American football from Atlanta
African-American players of American football
21st-century African-American people
20th-century African-American sportspeople